Paranephrops zealandicus is a species of southern crawfish in the family Parastacidae. It is found in New Zealand.

The IUCN conservation status of Paranephrops zealandicus is "LC", least concern, with no immediate threat to the species' survival.

References

Further reading

 
 

Parastacidae
Endemic fauna of New Zealand
Freshwater crustaceans of New Zealand
Crustaceans described in 1847
Taxa named by Adam White (zoologist)
Articles created by Qbugbot
Endemic crustaceans of New Zealand